Jo Inge Berget (born 11 September 1990) is a Norwegian professional footballer who plays as a forward for Swedish club Malmö FF. He has played professionally in his homeland, Italy, Wales, Scotland, Sweden and the United States, and made his debut for the Norway national team in 2012.

Club career

Early career
Berget started his career at Lyn and played twice before left the club. He signed a reported three-year contract with Udinese in July 2008. The club also signed team-mate Odion Ighalo and they started out playing in the Primavera U20 team.

In March 2009, he was loaned back to Lyn until 2 August. In December 2009, he was loaned to Strømsgodset for one year. In January 2011, his loan was extended to 31 December 2011, but the loan deal was terminated when Berget was sold to Molde in July 2011.

Molde
Berget signed a three-year deal with Molde in September 2011. Berget made his debut for Molde in a 1–0 win home against Lillestrøm, replacing Mattias Moström in the 74th minute. He scored his first goal in the title-deciding match against Tromsø, where Molde FK celebrated the first league championship in the history of the club. Molde won the 2013 Norwegian Cup after rivals Rosenborg was defeated 4–2 in the final. Jo Inge Berget scored Molde's 2–2 equalizing goal in the 71st minute of the game.

Cardiff City and Celtic
On 24 January 2014, he signed for Cardiff City, to once again play under the manager Ole Gunnar Solskjær, who was previously his boss at Molde. He made his debut on 15 February in the fifth round of the FA Cup, starting in a 1–2 home defeat to holders Wigan Athletic. A week later he made his Premier League debut in his only other game for the Bluebirds, playing the final 11 minutes in place of Fraizer Campbell at the end of a 0–4 home defeat to Hull City. Cardiff finished the season in 20th position and were relegated to the Championship.

Berget signed a short-term loan deal with Celtic in July 2014, with the option of making the deal permanent in January 2015. He scored twice as Celtic beat Dundee United 6–1 on his home debut. His loan expired on 1 January 2015 and having returned to Cardiff, he left two weeks later after his contract was cancelled by mutual consent.

Malmö FF
On 19 January 2015 he signed a three-year-long contract with Swedish champions Malmö FF. On 19 August 2015, he scored a brace against former club Celtic, in a 3–2 defeat at Celtic Park in the first leg of the Champions League playoffs. He also featured heavily with hard work on the wing in the return leg as Malmö overturned the deficit to win 2–0, rendering Malmö's qualification to the group stage.

New York City FC
On 19 January 2018, Berget signed with Major League Soccer side New York City FC. After just one season in MLS, Berget and New York City mutually parted ways.

Return to Malmö FF
In March 2019, Berget signed a three year contract with Malmö FF.

International career
Berget made his debut for Norway on 18 January 2012 at the 2012 King's Cup in Thailand, playing the first half of a 1–0 win over the hosts at the Rajamangala Stadium in Bangkok.

Career statistics

Club

International

Appearances and goals by national team and year

International goals
Scores and results list Norway's goal tally first.

Berget scored both goals, but the second one was credited as Vedran Ćorluka own goal.

Honours
Strømsgodset
 Norwegian Cup: 2010

Molde
 Tippeligaen: 2011, 2012
 Norwegian Cup: 2013

Malmö FF
 Allsvenskan: 2016, 2017, 2020, 2021
 Svenska Cupen: 2021–22

Norway U21
UEFA European Under-21 Championship bronze: 2013

References

External links

 Malmö FF profile 
 
 

1990 births
Living people
People from Hadeland
Association football wingers
Association football forwards
Norwegian footballers
Norway under-21 international footballers
Norway international footballers
Lyn Fotball players
Udinese Calcio players
Strømsgodset Toppfotball players
Molde FK players
Cardiff City F.C. players
Celtic F.C. players
Malmö FF players
New York City FC players
Eliteserien players
Premier League players
Allsvenskan players
Major League Soccer players
Norwegian expatriate footballers
Expatriate footballers in Italy
Norwegian expatriate sportspeople in Italy
Norwegian expatriate sportspeople in Sweden
Norwegian expatriate sportspeople in the United States
Expatriate footballers in Wales
Expatriate footballers in Scotland
Expatriate footballers in Sweden
Expatriate soccer players in the United States
Scottish Professional Football League players
Norwegian expatriate sportspeople in Wales
Norwegian expatriate sportspeople in Scotland
Sportspeople from Innlandet